Quadrille is a 1997 French comedy film directed by and starring Valérie Lemercier. It also features André Dussollier, Sandrine Kiberlain and Sergio Castellitto.

It is a remake of Sacha Guitry's 1938 film of the same title.

Cast
 Valérie Lemercier as Paulette Nanteuil  
 André Dussollier as Philippe de Morannes  
 Sandrine Kiberlain as Claudine André  
 Sergio Castellitto as Carl Herickson  
 Didier Bénureau as Doctor Lamache  
 Franck de la Personne as The majordome  
 Lise Lamétrie as The maid
 Michelle Dagain as The maid 2 
 Nicolas Seguy as The groom   
 Michel Jean as The porter  
 Emmanuel Benjamin as The butler

References

Bibliography 
 Carrie Tarr & Brigitte Rollet. Cinema and the Second Sex: Women's Filmmaking in France in the 1980s and 1990s. Bloomsbury Publishing, 2016.

External links 
 

1997 films
French comedy films
1997 comedy films
1990s French-language films
Films based on works by Sacha Guitry
Films directed by Valérie Lemercier
Films set in Paris
1990s French films